Tension myositis syndrome (TMS), also known as tension myoneural syndrome or mindbody syndrome, is a name given by John E. Sarno to a condition of psychogenic musculoskeletal and nerve symptoms, most notably back pain.  Sarno described TMS in four books, and stated that the condition may be involved in other pain disorders as well. The treatment protocol for TMS includes education, writing about emotional issues, resumption of a normal lifestyle and, for some patients, support meetings and/or psychotherapy. In 2007, David Schechter (a medical doctor and former student and research assistant of Sarno's) published a peer-reviewed study of TMS treatment in the journal "Alternative Therapies in Health and Medicine," showing a 54% success rate for chronic back pain. In terms of statistical significance and success rate, the study outperformed similar studies of other psychological interventions for chronic back pain.

The TMS diagnosis and treatment protocol are not accepted by the mainstream medical community. However, TMS and Sarno's treatment methods have received national attention, including a segment on ABC's  20/20; an episode of Larry King Live; an interview with Medscape; and articles in Newsweek, The Seattle Times, and The New York Times. Celebrity doctors who support TMS treatment include Andrew Weil and Mehmet Oz. Notable patients treated for tension myositis syndrome include Senator Tom Harkin, John Stossel, Howard Stern, and Anne Bancroft. In 2017, TMS was covered favorably in journalist C. J. Ramin's book Crooked. Ramin, who herself suffered from back pain for decades, criticized many of the popular back pain treatments and called Sarno "the rock star of the back world."

Theory
According to Sarno, TMS is a condition in which unconscious emotional issues (primarily rage, though other practitioners include other subconscious emotional issues such as anxiety, past trauma, and fear) initiate a process that causes physical pain and other symptoms. His theory suggests that the unconscious mind uses the autonomic nervous system to decrease blood flow to muscles, nerves or tendons, resulting in oxygen deprivation (temporary micro-ischemia) and metabolite accumulation, experienced as pain in the affected tissues. Sarno theorized that because patients often report that back pain seems to move around, up and down the spine, or from side to side, that this implies the pain may not be caused by a physical deformity or injury.

Sarno stated that the underlying cause of the pain is the mind's defense mechanism against unconscious mental stress and emotions such as anger, anxiety and narcissistic rage. The conscious mind is distracted by the physical pain, as the psychological repression process keeps the anger and rage contained in the unconscious and thereby prevented from entering conscious awareness. Sarno believed that when patients recognize that the symptoms are only a distraction, the symptoms then serve no purpose and subsequently go away. TMS can be considered a psychosomatic condition and has been referred to as a "distraction pain syndrome."

Sarno was a vocal critic of conventional medicine with regard to diagnosis and treatment of back pain, which is often treated by rest, physical therapy, exercise and/or surgery.

Symptoms
Back pain is frequently mentioned as a TMS symptom, but Sarno defined TMS symptoms much more broadly:
 Symptom type: TMS symptoms include pain, stiffness, weakness, tingling, numbness, muscle contractures, cramps and other negative sensations, according to Sarno.
 Symptom location: In addition to the back, Sarno stated that TMS symptoms can occur in the neck, knee, arms, wrists, and other parts of the body. Schechter states that the symptoms have a tendency to move to other parts of the body.  He considers symptom movement an important indicator that the pain is from TMS.

Diagnosis
Below is a list of criteria for diagnosing TMS, according to Schechter and Sarno:
Lack of known physical cause:  Schechter and Sarno state that a physical examination, tests and imaging studies is needed to rule out serious conditions, such as tumors. Sarno considers spinal disc herniations to generally be harmless, because he says the symptom location does not even correlate to the herniation location.
Tender points: While medical doctors use eleven of eighteen tender points as a diagnostic criteria for fibromyalgia, Sarno states that he uses six main tender points to diagnose TMS:  two tender points in the upper trapezius muscles, two in the lumbar paraspinal muscles and two in the lateral upper buttocks. He states that these are found in 99% of TMS patients.
History of other psychosomatic disorders:  Schechter and Sarno consider a prior history of other psychosomatic disorders an indication that the patient may have TMS.  They list irritable bowel syndrome and tension headache as examples of psychosomatic disorders.

Schechter and Sarno state that if a patient is unable to visit a medical doctor who is trained in TMS, then the patient should see a traditional medical doctor to rule out serious disorders, such as fractures, tumors and infections.

Treatment

Treatment protocol
The treatment protocol for TMS includes education, writing about emotional issues and resumption of a normal lifestyle. For patients who do not recover quickly, the protocol also includes support groups and/or psychotherapy.

Sarno's protocol for treatment of TMS is used by the Harvard RSI Action Group, a student volunteer organization, as part of their preventative education and support program for people with repetitive strain injury, also referred to as "RSI".

Education
Education may take the form of office visits, lectures and written and audio materials. The content of the education includes the psychological and physiological aspects of TMS. According to Schechter, the education allows the patients to "learn that their physical condition is actually benign and that any disability they have is a function of pain-related fear and de-conditioning, not the actual risk of further 're-injury.'"

Writing about emotional issues
Sarno stated that each patient should set aside time daily to think and write about issues that could have led to the patient's repressed emotions. He recommended the following two writing tasks:
 Writing a list of issues. Dr. Sarno stated that each patient should try to list out all issues that might contribute to the patient's repressed emotions. He suggested looking in the following areas:  
(a) certain childhood experiences, such as abuse or lack of love, 
(b) personality traits such as perfectionism, conscientiousness and a strong need to be liked, approved or validated by everyone, 
(c) current life stresses and pressures, 
(d) aging and mortality and 
(e) situations in which the patient experiences conscious but unexpressed anger.
 Writing essays. Dr. Sarno recommended that the patient write an essay for each item on the above list. He preferred longer essays because they force the patient to examine the emotional issues in depth.

Schechter developed a 30-day daily journal called "The MindBody Workbook" to assist the patient in recording emotionally significant events and making correlations between those events and their physical symptoms. According to Sarno and Schechter, daily repetition of the psychological process over time defeats the repression through conscious awareness.

Resumption of a normal lifestyle
To return to a normal lifestyle, patients are told to take the following actions:
 Discontinuation of physical treatments - Sarno advises patients to stop using spinal manipulation, physical therapy and other physical treatments because "they tend to reinforce erroneously a structural causation for the chronic pain."
 Resumption of normal physical activity - Schechter states that patients are encouraged to "gradually be more active, and begin to resume a normal life." In addition, patients are encouraged "to discontinue the safety behaviours aimed at protecting their 'damaged' backs".

Support meetings
Sarno used support meetings for patients who do not make a prompt recovery. Sarno stated that the support meetings (a) allow the patients to explore emotional issues that may be causing their symptoms and (b) review concepts covered during the earlier education.

Psychotherapy
Sarno said that about 20% of his patients need psychotherapy. He stated that he used "short-term, dynamic, analytically oriented psychotherapy." Schechter says that he uses psychotherapy for about 30% of his patients, and that six to ten sessions are needed per patient.

Recovery Program
Alan Gordon, LCSW has created a TMS recovery program which includes various articles, exercises, and segments from sessions exemplifying therapeutic concepts.

Medical evidence
While psychogenic pain and pain disorder are accepted diagnoses in the medical community, the TMS modality is more controversial.

A non-peer-reviewed 2005 study by Schechter at the Seligman Medical Institute (SMI), co-authored with institute director Arthur Smith, found that treatment of TMS achieved a 57% success rate among patients with chronic back pain.

A peer-reviewed 2007 study with Schechter, Smith and Stanley Azen, Professor and Co-Director of Biostatistics in the Department of Preventative Medicine at the USC Keck School of Medicine, found a 54% success rate for treatment of TMS (P<.00001). The treatment consisted of office visits, at-home educational materials, writing about emotional issues and psychotherapy. The average pain duration for the study's patients was nine years.  Patients with less than six months of back pain were excluded to "control for the confounder that most back pain episodes typically resolve on their own in a few weeks."

Schechter, Smith and Azen also compared their results to the results of three studies of other psychological treatments for chronic back pain. The three non-TMS studies were selected because of (a) their quality, as judged by the Cochrane Collaboration, and (b) the similarity of their pain measurements to those used in the TMS study.  Of the three non-TMS studies, only one (the Turner study) showed a statistically significant improvement. Compared to the 2007 TMS study, the Turner study had a lower success rate (26–35%, depending on the type of psychological treatment) and a lower level of statistical significance (P<.05).

Schechter, et al. state that one advantage of TMS treatment is that it avoids the risks associated with surgery and medication, but they caution that the risks of TMS treatment are somewhat unknown due to the relatively low number of patients studied so far.

A 2021 study found that mind-body program outperforms other forms of treatment for chronic back pain.

Notable patients
Notable patients who have been treated for TMS include the following:
Radio personality Howard Stern credited TMS treatment with the relief of his "excruciating back and shoulder pain", as well as his obsessive-compulsive disorder.
20/20 co-anchor John Stossel was treated by Sarno for his chronic debilitating back pain. In a 20/20 segment on his former doctor, Stossel stated his opinion that the TMS treatment "cured" his back pain, although he admitted that he continues to have relapses of pain.
Television writer and producer Janette Barber said that for three years, she had been increasingly unable to walk, and eventually began to use a wheelchair, due to severe ankle pain originally diagnosed as tendinitis. She was later diagnosed and treated for TMS.  According to Barber, she was "pain-free one week after [Sarno's] lecture" and able to walk and run within a few months, notwithstanding her "occasional" relapses of pain.
The late actress Anne Bancroft said that she saw several doctors for back pain, but only Sarno's TMS treatment helped her.
The acclaimed filmmaker Terry Zwigoff said he was on the verge of suicide due to his debilitating back pain, until he turned in desperation to Sarno's method and it "saved [his] life", as well as the life of a woman he told about it more recently.
Mindbody health consultant, life-coach, and author Steven Ray Ozanich suffered from TMS back pain for 27 years and at one point had a paralyzed left leg before understanding the truth of his condition through Dr. John E. Sarno. Ozanich wrote a book entitled The Great Pain Deception where he tells his story and provides information related to TMS. His book is endorsed on the cover by Sarno and TMS physician Marc D. Sopher. Ozanich has subsequently written two more books on TMS: Dr. John Sarno's Top 10 Healing Discoveries and Back Pain Permanent Healing: Understanding the Myths, Lies and Confusion.

Controversy
The TMS diagnosis and treatment protocol are not accepted by the mainstream medical community. Sarno himself stated in a 2004 interview with Medscape Orthopaedics & Sports Medicine that "99.999% of the medical profession does not accept this diagnosis." Although the vast majority of medical doctors do not accept TMS, there are doctors who do. Andrew Weil, an alternative medicine proponent, endorses TMS treatment for back pain. Mehmet Oz, a television personality and Professor of Surgery at Columbia University, includes TMS treatment in his four recommendations for treating back pain. Richard E. Sall, a medical doctor who authored a book on worker's compensation, includes TMS in a list of conditions he considers possible causes of back pain resulting in missed work days that increase the costs of worker's compensation programs.

Patients typically see their doctor when the pain is at its worst and pain chart scores statistically improve over time even if left untreated; most people recover from an episode of back pain within weeks without any medical intervention at all. The TMS theory has also been criticized as too simplistic to account for the complexity of pain syndromes. James Rainville, a medical doctor at New England Baptist Hospital, said that while TMS treatment works for some patients, Sarno mistakenly uses the TMS diagnosis for other patients who have real physical problems.

Sarno's response was that he had success with many patients who have exhausted every other means of treatment, which he said is proof that regression to the mean is not the cause. TMS was covered favorably in a recent book on back pain Crooked: Outwitting the Back Pain Industry and Getting on the Road to Recovery by Cathryn Jakobson Ramin with her remarking that : "Every time I told anyone I was writing about back pain, I learned to expect questions about whether I knew Sarno’s work. Almost everyone had run into someone who had been cured by Sarno, often after years of discomfort. I was happy to be able to inform his many admirers that, yes, I had actually spoken with the rock star of the back world."

Notes and references

External links
What Is the Mind-Body Connection?

Musculoskeletal disorders
Syndromes
Alternative diagnoses
Mind–body interventions